Barbiturate overdose is poisoning due to excessive doses of barbiturates. Symptoms typically include difficulty thinking, poor coordination, decreased level of consciousness, and a decreased effort to breathe (respiratory depression). Complications of overdose can include noncardiogenic pulmonary edema. If death occurs this is typically due to a lack of breathing.

Barbiturate overdose may occur by accident or purposefully in an attempt to cause death. The toxic effects are additive to those of alcohol and benzodiazepines. The lethal dose varies with a person's tolerance and how the drug is taken. The effects of barbiturates occur via the GABA neurotransmitter. Exposure may be verified by testing the urine or blood.

Treatment involves supporting a person's breathing and blood pressure. While there is no antidote, activated charcoal may be useful. Multiple doses of charcoal may be required. Hemodialysis may occasionally be considered. Urine alkalinisation has not been found to be useful. While once a common cause of overdose, barbiturates are now a rare cause.

Mechanism
Barbiturates increase the time that the chloride pore of the GABAA receptor is opened, thereby increasing the efficacy of GABA. In contrast, benzodiazepines increase the frequency with which the chloride pore is opened, thereby increasing GABA's potency.

Treatment
Treatment involves supporting a person's breathing and blood pressure. While there is no antidote, activated charcoal may be useful. Multiple doses of charcoal may be required. Hemodialysis may occasionally be considered. Urine alkalinisation has not been found to be useful.

If a person is drowsy but awake and can swallow and breathe without difficulty, the treatment can be as simple as monitoring the person closely. If the person is not breathing, it may involve mechanical ventilation until the drug has worn off. Psychiatric consult is generally recommended.

Notable cases
People who are known to have died by suicide from barbiturate overdose include, Gillian Bennett, Charles Boyer, Ruan Lingyu, Victor Folke Nelson, Dalida, Jeannine "The Singing Nun" Deckers, Felix Hausdorff, Abbie Hoffman, Phyllis Hyman, Marilyn Monroe, Cesare Pavese, C. P. Ramanujam, George Sanders, Carole Landis, 
Jean Seberg, Lupe Vélez and the members of  Heaven's Gate cult. Others who have died as a result of barbiturate overdose include Pier Angeli, Brian Epstein, Judy Garland, Jimi Hendrix, Inger Stevens, Dinah Washington, Ellen Wilkinson, and Alan Wilson; in some cases these have been speculated to be suicides as well. Those who died of a combination of barbiturates and other drugs include Rainer Werner Fassbinder, Dorothy Kilgallen, Malcolm Lowry, Edie Sedgwick and Kenneth Williams. Dorothy Dandridge died of either an overdose or an unrelated embolism. Ingeborg Bachmann may have died of the consequences of barbiturate withdrawal (she was hospitalized with burns, the doctors treating her not being aware of her barbiturate addiction). Maurice Chevalier attempted suicide in March 1971 by swallowing a large amount of barbiturates and slitting his wrists. While he lived, he suffered severe organ damage as a result and died from multiple organ failure nine months later.

Differential diagnosis 
The differential diagnosis should include intoxication by other substances with sedative effects, such as benzodiazepines, anticonvulsants (carbamazepine), alcohols (ethanol, ethylene glycol, methanol), opioids, carbon monoxide, sleep aids, and gamma-Hydroxybutyric acid (GHB – a known date rape drug). Natural disease that can result in disorientation may be in the differential, including hypoglycemia and myxedema coma. In the right setting, hypothermia should be ruled out.

References

External links

Poisoning by drugs, medicaments and biological substances
Barbiturates
Suicide methods
Wikipedia medicine articles ready to translate
Wikipedia emergency medicine articles ready to translate